is Rimi Natsukawa's first full-length cover album, released on .

Her cover of "'S Wonderful" was used as the JVC Everio camcorder commercial song.

Background

"Uta Sagashi" was released 8 months after her 5th studio album, "Umui Kaji." It was her first cover album since 2003's "Famureuta." The project was decided on to extend Natsukawa's signature songs (based on the fact that her two most popular songs, "Nada Sōsō" and "Warabigami" are both covers).

Fans submitted song suggestions to Natsukawa's website or at her live concerts. A total of 2,000 were chosen by fans, and the top 100 were given to Natsukawa to select. Natsukawa listened to each of these songs once or twice, and chose the songs she found catchy and were practical to sing. Roughly half of the songs are ones that Natsukawa had performed in concert or on live television at some point.

Natsukawa's favourite song in the selection process was "Kiseki no Hana" written by Lyrico, a song she had requested herself. The song, after hearing Lyrico in concert, had the same effect "Nada Sōsō" had on her the first time she had heard it.

The album was preceded by three digital singles released on iTunes. Each single featured two tracks from the album. "Jidai/Wasurete wa Ikenai Mono" was released in late September, followed by "Hana Saku Tabiji/Kiseki no Hana" in late October. "Cosmos/Kokoro" was released in early November, two weeks before the album's release.

Song sources

Unlike Natsukawa's previous covers, the majority of the songs chosen are either Japanese pop music standards, or popular music songs. "Cosmos," "Jidai" and "Nagoriyuki" are standards from the '70s (popularised by Momoe Yamaguchi, Miyuki Nakajima and Iruka respectively). "Miagete Goran Yoru no Hoshi o" is a song by Kyu Sakamoto from 1963, and "Shōnen Jidai" is a more recent standard, by Yōsui Inoue in 1990.

Two standards were released earlier than 1950, but were later released as film theme songs. "Soshū Yakyoku" was performed by Yoshiko Ōtaka in the film "Shina no Yoru" (1940), and later used as the theme song for the 1953 film "Hōyō." "'S Wonderful" is an English standard, first used in the 1927 musical "Funny Face." It was used in the 1950s films "An American in Paris" and "Funny Face."

Natsukawa covered two recent popular hit songs: "Chiisana Koi no Uta" by Mongol800 (2001) and "Sakura (Dokushō)" by Naotarō Moriyama. Naotarō is the son of Ryoko Moriyama, the singer who first released Natsukawa's hit song "Nada Sōsō" and wrote the lyrics to it.

Two songs are covers of recent songs that were not popular hits. "Kiseki no Hana" was originally sung by Lyrico in 2002, and "Wasurete wa Ikenai Mono" by Kobukuro in 2004. These songs were collaborations with people Natsukawa has worked with before: Takeshi Senoo had arranged the song "Shimadachi" from Natsukawa's 2005 album "Ayakaji no Ne," and Kentarō Kobuchi of Kobukuro had written Natsukawa's single "Sayōnara Arigatō" (along with "Wasurete wa Ikenai Mono").

Two songs are from the 1990s. "Hana Saku Tabiji" is a popular song by Southern All Stars keyboardist Yuko Hara (from her 1991 album "Mother") and "Kokoro" is a song by Tomoe Sawa.

One of the songs is an Okinawan folk song, "Densaa Bushi." It was originally written in 1768. The song was not requested from the fan tally, however, it was requested by Natsukawa's mother.

Reception

The album broke the top 20 and sold roughly 40,000 copies. This makes the album Natsukawa's most commercially successful release of new recordings since 2003's "Famureuta," and her highest charting album of new recordings (her second highest charting Japanese release after "Rimi Natsukawa Single Collection Vol. 1").

The project was originally only meant to last from 2007–2008, and feature the album and a tour. However, due to this popularity, a second cover album, "Uta Sagashi: Asia no Kaze," was released just over two years later in 2010.

Track listing

Japan sales rankings

References

Rimi Natsukawa albums
2007 albums
Victor Entertainment albums
Covers albums